Kambhampadu may refer to:

Kambhampadu, Macherla mandal, a village in Macherla mandal, Guntur district, Andhra Pradesh
Kambhampadu, Pedakurapadu mandal,  a village in Pedakurapadu mandal, Guntur district, Andhra Pradesh